Dmitry Ivanovich Kursky (– 20 December 1932) was a Russian Soviet jurist and statesman.

Kursky joined the Bolshevik faction of the Russian Social Democratic Labour Party in 1904. He served as the chairman of the Drissa town Soviet. He was the People's Commissar for Justice of the RSFSR and the USSR from 1918–1928. He committed suicide in 1932.

References

External links 
 Biography 
 Kursky, Dmytry Ivanovich 
 The History of Communist Party of the Soviet Union 

1874 births
1932 deaths
Old Bolsheviks
Russian Social Democratic Labour Party members
Russian communists
People's commissars and ministers of the Soviet Union
Communist Party of the Soviet Union members
Ambassadors of the Soviet Union to Italy
1932 suicides